Microhyus is a genus of true weevils in the beetle family Curculionidae. There is at least one described species in Microhyus, M. setiger.

References

Further reading

 
 
 

Molytinae
Articles created by Qbugbot